Tomislav Uskok (born 22 July 1991) is an Australian footballer who plays for Macarthur FC in the A-League.

Club career

Early years
Uskok came through the junior ranks at local club Melbourne Knights. He departed the club in 2009 in search of first team football, subsequently joining Victorian Premier League side Richmond SC. With first team opportunities scarce for the 18-year-old, he then joined Victorian State League Division 1 side St Albans Saints for the second half of the 2010 season.

Melbourne Knights
In 2011, Uskok returned to Melbourne Knights. In 2014, Uskok scored in a 2–0 win over traditional rivals South Melbourne, a win that saw the Knights qualify for the Round of 32 of the 2014 FFA Cup. Uskok went on to score a 120th-minute winner in the 2014 Dockerty Cup final, as Melbourne Knights beat South Springvale SC to claim their first piece of major since 1996.

In February 2015, Uskok was handed the captaincy at his boyhood club, stating "It's a great honour and a privilege." Uskok departed Knights in September 2015, as he relocated to Sydney, and was set to join a club in the National Premier Leagues NSW in 2016, before his career took a turn.

Central Coast Mariners
Uskok signed for A-League club Central Coast Mariners on 23 November 2015, as the club sought a replacement to the recently released Eddy Bosnar. The contract was to end in June 2016 and was the 24-year-old's first shot at professional football.

Uskok made his competitive first team debut for Central Coast Mariners in their home clash against Melbourne City on 3 December 2015. The former Knights captain made his starting debut in Round 15, playing the full 90 minutes as his side went down 3–1 to Adelaide United. Uskok was named in the A-League team of the week in Central Coast's 2–0 loss to Melbourne Victory, a match in which he made a very good showing, keeping marquee Victory striker Besart Berisha quiet.

On 11 April 2016, Uskok was released by the Mariners after making seven appearances in his time at the club.

Sydney United 58
On 15 April 2016, National Premier Leagues NSW club Sydney United 58 announced that they had signed the imposing central defender for the remainder of the 2016 NPL NSW season. Uskok scored on debut for Sydney United in a 3–0 win over Blacktown Spartans on 16 April 2016, coming on as a substitute to tuck in the third goal. On 10 July 2016, Uskok claimed the 2016 Waratah Cup with United, achieving an 8.5 match rating from FourFourTwo Australia.

Return to Melbourne Knights
Uskok returned to Melbourne Knights for the 2018 season.

Return to Sydney United 58
Uskok departed Melbourne Knights midway through the 2019 season and re-signed with Sydney United in National Premier Leagues NSW.

Western United
Uskok joined A-League club Western United FC in January 2020 as their second signing for that month. Uskok scored his first A-League goal in a 2-1 derby win over Melbourne Victory FC. Prior to his second season with Western United, he was named the club's vice-captain. Manager Mark Rudan commented: "Tomi came in halfway through the season and he was an exceptional leader for us, a great communicator. He’s one for the future as far as we’re concerned, we can build a club around Tomi. In a very short space of time he’s got the respect of all the players and the coaching staff as well."

Macarthur FC

Uskok joined Macarthur FC on a two-year contract in July 2021.

Honours

Club
Melbourne Knights:
 Dockerty Cup: 2014

Sydney United:
 National Premier Leagues: 2016
 National Premier Leagues NSW Premiership: 2016
 Waratah Cup: 2016

Macarthur FC
Australia Cup: 2022

References

External links

1991 births
Living people
Association football defenders
Australian soccer players
A-League Men players
National Premier Leagues players
Central Coast Mariners FC players
Melbourne Knights FC players
Richmond SC players
St Albans Saints SC players
Sydney United 58 FC players
Western United FC players
Macarthur FC players
Australian people of Croatian descent